Richard Broke may refer to:
Sir Richard Broke (judge) (died 1529), English judge, MP for City of London
Richard Broke (14th century MP), MP for Rochester in 1395

See also
R. B. Freeman (Richard Broke Freeman, 1915–1986), British zoologist
Richard Brooke (disambiguation)